Jean-Louis Bertuccelli (3 June 1942 – 6 March 2014) was a French film director and screenwriter. He died in March 2014 at age of 71.

Selected filmography
 Ramparts of Clay (1971)
 Docteur Françoise Gailland (1976)
 The Accuser (1977)
 A Day to Remember (1991)
 Sur un air de mambo (1996) TV Movie

References

External links

1942 births
2014 deaths
French film directors
French male screenwriters
French screenwriters
Writers from Paris